Sermo (stylized as SERMO) is a private social media network for physicians, open to licensed physicians in the United States and 149 other countries across Europe, North and South America, Africa, and English-speaking Oceania.

History 
Sermo was founded by physician Daniel Palestrant in 2005 as an adverse effect reporting system, in response to what Palestrant considered failures in the US healthcare system during Merck's 2004 Vioxx (Rofecoxib) recall.

In 2007 Sermo raised $26.7 million and in 2011 it raised an additional $3.5 million. The site developed into a discussion board covering a variety of non-clinical and clinical topics. In 2012, WorldOne, a data-collection company, bought Sermo, and "Sermo" was rebranded to "SERMO" in 2014.

Following this, the community expanded from the US into 6 additional English-speaking countries, including Australia, Canada, Ireland, New Zealand, South Africa, and the United Kingdom. In September, 2014 the community was also expanded to Spain and Mexico. Sermo is both a social networking site and medical crowdsourcing entity for physicians to receive aid on the medical problems of their patients from other physicians.

Community
In 2014, 3,500 patient cases were posted by doctors in the US. These cases were viewed 700,000 times and received 50,000 comments. The average patient case received a response within 1.5 hours and were marked as resolved within 24 hours. The site has about 550,000 members, with its membership including physicians from the US, UK, Canada, Australia, South Africa, Ireland, Spain, Mexico and New Zealand.

Sermo also has twice weekly opinion polls on topics related to physicians issues, which have been cited publications including Forbes Magazine, The Washington Post, The New Orleans Times-Picayune, and Time Magazine.

References

External links
SERMO.com
RealTime
Blog

Medical professional networks
2005 establishments in the United States